Kaya toast is a dish consisting of two slices of toast with butter and kaya (coconut jam), commonly served alongside coffee and soft-boiled eggs. In Singapore, the dish is commonly consumed for breakfast. It became integrated into kopi tiam (coffee shop) culture, being widely available in food chains such as Ya Kun Kaya Toast, Killiney Kopitiam and Breadtalk's Toast Box.

History

It is believed that Hainanese immigrants created the kaya toast by adapting what they had previously prepared while serving on British ships docked at ports during the Straits Settlements period. The kaya spread was considered a replacement for Western fruit jams.

In the past, traditional snack shops could only be found in a few locations such as Chinatown and Balestier Road. However, Singapore started actively promoting its street food or hawker fare via the Singapore Tourism Board (STB). In 1994,  it held a month-long event to advertise traditional foods called the Singaporean Food Festival, which is hosted every year. Particularly in 2004, Kaya toast was featured by the Singapore Tourism Board in its "Uniquely Singapore Shop & Eat Tours", serving as the symbol for a local snack.

Government efforts of placing coffee carts situated on the streets into hawker centres also significantly assisted the kaya toast business. As of December 2005, the Singapore foodscape houses an estimate of over 70 outlets selling kaya toast, excluding small coffee-shops that are not listed on the internet or does not have a website. Since then, kaya toast has become a regular item in café and can be found at almost every hawker centre.

The preparation method and appearance of kaya toast has changed. Sellers use electric grills instead of the traditional charcoal grills. Previously, hawker workers would use homemade bread but have now opted to order bread supplies from factories. While the methods and ingredients have been simplified, one thing that has yet to change drastically is the kaya spread itself. The kaya spreads used in renowned retailers, such as Ya Kun Kaya Toast and Killiney Kopitiam, are still produced from traditional recipes. It is also worth noting that changes in the method, menu, and economy have not necessarily led to a decline in traditional food sellers. Singapore itself does not prevent the rise of micro-entrepreneurs in the department of traditional food.

In June 2021, South Korean convenience store chain CU announced that it has begun selling Kaya toast at all of their stores as part of their "Singapore Gourmet Trip series".

In 2021, the Monetary Authority of Singapore (MAS) unveiled commemorative coins that features Kaya toast as well as other local dishes, as part of its commemoration over the inscription of hawker culture into the UNESCO Intangible Cultural Heritage Lists that previous year.

Variations 
One slice of kaya toast is usually accompanied by another with butter, to make a sandwich, alongside coffee and two runny soft-boiled eggs, paired with dark soy sauce and white pepper.

In Malaysia, roti bakar or toast which is prepared with butter and kaya is sometimes referred to as "kaya toast" in English.

Nutrition

One portion of kaya toast (108.7 gram) is categorized as a low Glycemic Index (GI) food with an average score of 49 on the scale.

Ingredients and preparation
The bread should be grilled over charcoal, but may also be grilled or toasted, and is then buttered. The kaya jam should be spread on top of the cold butter. To enjoy the Hainanese breakfast as per tradition, the soft-cooked egg should be cracked in a bowl, adding soy sauce and white pepper to taste. Then the kaya toast should be generously dipped into it before being enjoyed. It is best served immediately; the butter should still be cold when eaten.

See also

 Roti bakar
 Ogura toast
 Toast sandwich

References

Further reading

External links

Singaporean cuisine
Toast dishes